Sputnik is a 2020 Russian science-fiction horror film directed by Egor Abramenko in his feature directorial debut. It stars Oksana Akinshina as a young doctor who is recruited by the Soviet military to assess a cosmonaut who survived a mysterious space accident and returned to Earth with a dangerous organism living inside him. Alongside Akinshina, the film's cast includes Pyotr Fyodorov and Fyodor Bondarchuk.

Sputnik was scheduled to have its world premiere at the Tribeca Film Festival in April 2020 prior to the festival being postponed due to the COVID-19 pandemic. The film was released on video-on-demand in Russia on April 23, 2020. It received generally positive reviews from critics.

Plot
In 1983, during the last hot period of the Cold War, two Russian cosmonauts engaged in an orbital research mission experienced something inexplicable while returning to Earth: they see something moving outside their ship. The spacecraft malfunctions on re-entry and crashes in Kazakhstan, and only one of the cosmonauts, Konstantin, survives. He is taken to an isolated military facility, where Dr. Tatyana Klimova, a young psychiatrist under review for her controversial methods in psychiatry, is brought in, recruited by the officer in charge, Colonel Semiradov. She is not told the real reason for Konstantin's quarantine, but she soon discovers that the cosmonaut brought back an extraterrestrial life-form inside his own body without knowing it himself. The creature comes out during the night, while its host is asleep. Colonel Semiradov reveals to her that she is here to determine how to separate Konstantin and the creature, since they seem to have developed a completely symbiotic relationship, with the creature living in the esophagus of the cosmonaut and benefiting from his nutrients, while Konstantin has made an impossible recovery from his injuries received after the crash-landing.

Tatyana confronts Konstantin by telling him she knows he has a child whom he has abandoned at an orphanage, implying he is not a national hero but a coward who does not care about his son, with the purpose of stressing him. Thanks to this, she discovers that the creature is affected by hormone levels and that one of the videos she has been shown has been altered, which leads to her discovering a horrifying truth: the creature does not feed from whatever Konstantin eats, but rather eats live humans, and that Semiradov has been feeding it prisoners. The creature shows itself to its victims in order to augment their fear, which makes the human brain release cortisol, from which the alien obtains its nutrition. Disgusted and horrified by this, she confronts Semiradov, only to be told that the real reason they are here is to find a way to turn the alien into a weapon that they can control. He asks her if she will cooperate, to which she seems to agree.

Later on, and because she has developed a caring relationship with Konstantin, she takes him on a run around the facility, and under the guise of exercising she informs him that he has a parasitic creature inside him and the plans of the military for him. They agree to evade surveillance and meet later on, when she shows him the bodies of the people the creature killed, and the still living astronaut who was in the spacecraft with Konstantin: he was not infected because he had cancer, which had gone undetected by the tests done before the mission, but which the creature must have been able to sense. It is revealed that Konstantin was well aware of his unwanted guest and of what the creature does when it is not attached to him. Tatyana is shocked at this revelation, and Konstantin tells her that, in order to take care of his son, he will do anything in order to get out of this place.

Tatyana finally determines that she wants to help Konstantin and with the help of another doctor inside the facility, stages an escape. She shows Konstantin a syringe with drugs that will simulate Addison's disease, the same type of disease the other cosmonaut had. Technically, she reasons this would force the creature out, hopefully, dying within the hour outside its host.

As they make their escape, they are ambushed by Semiradov, who sends a response team after them. Tatyana is injured, and Konstantin asks her for the syringe. Upon injecting himself, the alien emerges and kills the team. Tatyana and Konstantin run away, but they do not make it far before Konstantin collapses. Tatyana realizes that Konstantin cannot survive without the alien, as they have become completely symbiotic, and she surrenders when Semiradov catches up with them. The Colonel has brought the now heavily injured creature in order to force it inside Konstantin; the latter however has the creature kill Semiradov and his soldiers, setting Tatyana and himself finally free. However, as the authorities descend on them, alerted to the monstrous experimentations of Semiradov, a revived Konstantin shoots himself in order to kill the creature, and himself alongside it.

Sometime later, Tatyana adopts Konstantin's son, and it is revealed she herself lived in an orphanage as a young girl.

Cast

Production
Principal photography for the film took place in Moscow in the winter of 2018–2019.

Release
Sputnik was scheduled to have its world premiere at the Tribeca Film Festival in April 2020 before the festival was postponed due to the COVID-19 pandemic. Sony Pictures had slated a theatrical release for the film in Russia on April 16, 2020, but the film was instead released on video-on-demand in Russia on the platforms More.tv, Wink and Ivi.ru on April 23. IFC Midnight acquired the film's North American distribution rights earlier that same month. The film was released in select theaters and on video-on-demand in North America on August 14, 2020.

Upon release in Russia, over one million people streamed Sputnik on More.tv, Wink and Ivi.ru, making the film the most-streamed title across those services in two years, surpassing American titles and other Russian titles.

Reception

Box office and VOD 
In its debut American weekend, the film was the fifth-most rented film on Apple TV, and also grossed around $11,000 from 32 theaters.

Critical response 
The site's critics consensus reads: "Effective space alien horror with a Soviet-era twist, Sputnik proves there are still some scary good sci-fi thrillers left in the galaxy." Metacritic assigned the film a weighted average score of 61 out of 100, based on 19 critics, indicating "generally favorable reviews".

Pavel Voronkov of Gazeta.Ru called the film's story "charmingly uncomplicated", and wrote that, unlike "The Blackout by Egor Baranov (in which Fedorov also acted), it does not hurt at all to watch." Dmitry Shepelyov of Igromania commended the film's visuals but lamented that "clichés become the main driving force of the story", concluding: "Tweak the script, write the characters better, add more bloody action, and Sputnik could be called an excellent fantasy thriller. But this is just a more or less competent B-category film."

Matt Zoller Seitz, in his review of the film for RogerEbert.com, gave it a score of three-and-a-half out of four stars, and praised the relationship between the two main characters: "The performances and characterizations add heft, and the very Russian vibe of soulful heaviness sets it apart from its American cousins." Ian Freer of Empire gave the film three out of five stars, praising its "fun creature design and good gore" and calling it a "blunt but effective thriller". Joe Morgenstern of The Wall Street Journal wrote that the film's "strong performances, strikingly spare production design and somber cinematography convey a sense of something important going on. That's no small achievement in what proves to be a creature feature with flair."

The New York Times Glenn Kenny wrote that "While Sputnik doesn't make its substantial borrowings from other sci-fi pictures entirely new, it does juice them up enough to yield a genuinely scary and satisfying experience." Tomris Laffley of Variety referred to the film as a "claustrophobic character study with gripping set pieces [and] serviceable spatters of gross-out B-movie gore"; she also praised Akinshina's "charismatic lead performance", comparing the character favorably to Ellen Ripley of the Alien franchise. Conversely, John DeFore of The Hollywood Reporter wrote that the film's "intensely serious tone belies some awfully silly stuff in its plot", and summarized the film as being "Duller than it sounds."

Accolades

See also
 Life (2017 film)

References

External links
 
 
 
 

2020 science fiction horror films
2020s science fiction thriller films
Russian science fiction horror films
Russian horror thriller films
Russian science fiction thriller films
Russian thriller drama films
Russian science fiction drama films
Russian horror drama films
Russian mystery thriller films
Films about astronauts
Films set in the 1980s
Films set in the Soviet Union
Films shot in Moscow
Films postponed due to the COVID-19 pandemic
Films not released in theaters due to the COVID-19 pandemic
Fiction about parasites
Films produced by Fyodor Bondarchuk